Frank Webb may refer to:
 Frank Webb (artist) (born 1927), American watercolor painter
 Frank J. Webb (1828–1894), African-American novelist, poet and essayist